Governor Harris may refer to:

 Andrew L. Harris (1835–1915), 44th Governor of Ohio
 Bartholomew Harris (died 1694), Governor of Bombay from 1690 to 1694
 Charles Alexander Harris (1855–1947), Governor of Newfoundland from 1917 to 1922
 Elisha Harris (1791–1861), 20th Governor of Rhode Island
 George Harris, 3rd Baron Harris (1810–1872), Governor of Trinidad from 1846 to 1854 and Governor of Madras from 1854 to 1859
 George Harris, 4th Baron Harris (1851–1932), Governor of Bombay from  1890 to 1895
 Isham G. Harris (1818–1897), 16th Governor of Tennessee
 Joe Frank Harris (born 1936), 78th Governor of Georgia
 Nathaniel Edwin Harris (1846–1929), 61st Governor of Georgia
 Robert Harris (diplomat) (born 1941), Governor of Anguilla from 1996 to 2000